The 1838 Illinois gubernatorial election was the sixth quadrennial election for this office.  Democrat Thomas Carlin was elected by a bare majority of the voters in a close election. He defeated Cyrus Edwards, the brother of former governor Ninian Edwards for the office.

Results

References
Illinois Blue Book 1899

Illinois
1838
Gubernatorial
August 1838 events